Peter or Pete Kelly may refer to:

Sports
 Pete Kelly (ice hockey) (1913–2004), Canadian ice hockey player
 Peter Kelly (cricketer) (born 1942), Australian cricketer
 Peter Kelly (Dublin hurler) (born 1989), hurling player with Dublin
 Peter Kelly (Gaelic footballer), Gaelic football player
 Peter Kelly (rugby league) (born 1959), Australian rugby league player
 Peter Kelly (soccer) (born 1991), American soccer player
 Peter Kelly (sports administrator) (1847–1908), president of the Gaelic Athletic Association
 Peter Kelley (born 1974), weightlifter

Politics
 Pete Kelly (Alaska politician) (born 1956), American politician
 Peter G. Kelly (born 1938), American lobbyist and political consultant
 Peter Kelly (Irish politician) (1944–2019), Irish Fianna Fáil politician and TD for Longford-Roscommon
 Peter Trainor Kelly (died 1948), Irish senator
 Peter Kelly (judge) (born 1946), former President of the High Court of Ireland
 Peter J. Kelly, mayor of the Halifax Regional Municipality, Nova Scotia, Canada, 2000–2012

Other
 Peter Kelly (piper) (1837–1910), Irish piper
 Peter X. Kelly (born 1959), restaurateur and chef

See also
 Pete Kelly's Blues (disambiguation)